Batchoy Tagalog, also known simply as batsoy, is a traditional Filipino food originating in the northern Philippines. It is a soup made with pork, pork offal, pork blood, noodles, chili leaves, green chilies, garlic, onions, and ginger. This dish is usually paired with or eaten with cooked rice as a meal.

Batchoy Tagalog is a common household dish, especially in countryside communities in the provinces. It is a staple whenever a small farm owner butchers a pig to sell to the neighborhood. The cooking method is similar to the usual cooking method of Filipino foods like minanok na baka and tinola. It has a similar ginger-flavored broth with chili leaves added. Traditionally, a minimal amount of pork blood or pork blood cubes is added to the soup.

Method
In a pot, saute onions, garlic, and ginger, then add chunks of pork meat and pork offal. Cook until slightly browned, then add splashes of water to tenderize the meat while boiling. A minimal amount of pork blood is added to the soup and left to boil until the blood releases water and coagulates. Season with salt, water, and fish sauce to taste, then add misua noodles and fresh chili leaves before turning off the stove.

Varieties
Varieties of batchoy Tagalog depend on the household's preference or accustomed way of cooking. Aside from misua, sotanghon is another commonly used noodle in the soup. A variation of batchoy without pork blood or without noodles is also common in the localities.  

One of the distinctive versions of batchoy Tagalog is the comfort soup named Bombay, or Bumbay, from the province of Quezon. The name depicts the turban worn by Indians who came to the local communities many years ago. The dish is made with a mixture of ingredients, such as ground pork, pork offal, and other seasonings, which are customarily assembled in a banana leaf pouch shaped like a turban and then simmered. Mushrooms, corn, and sweet potato shoots are may also added to the dish. It is then poured with a flavorful broth. This soup is usually eaten with steamed rice.

See also

Tinola
Dinuguan
La Paz Batchoy
Noodle soup
Pork blood soup

References

Philippine soups
Philippine cuisine
Philippine noodle dishes
Philippine pork dishes
Culture of Quezon
Noodle soups